The Egyptian Knowledge Bank (EKB) (Arabic: بنك المعرفة المصري) is an online library archive and resource that provides access to learning resources and tools for educators, researchers, students, and the general public of Egypt.

Establishment and aims
The initiative was announced on Science Day 2014 by the Egyptian President Abdel El-Fattah El-Sisi, was published online on Egyptian Youth Day January 9, 2016 during a celebration held at the Cairo Opera House, with a full access launch on January 23, 2016:  The Egyptian Education and Scientific Research Council signed agreements with over 26 regional and international publishing houses to be included in the Egyptian Knowledge Bank,. Tarek Shawki, chairman of The Presidential Advisory Council for Education and Scientific Research and Dean of the School of Sciences and Engineering at the American University in Cairo said in an interview with Times Higher Education that the project “...is an unprecedented attempt to spread the culture of knowledge and learning, and put a spotlight on the value of research.”

At the Knowledge Summit 2018, talks were held of establishing the Arab Digital Union, a combination of the online resources of the Saudi Digital Library, Egypt's Knowledge Bank, and the Dubai Digital Library. Tarek Shawki, talking on the subject of the Arab Digital Union, has said that it will "...help consolidate the cultural exchange among the Arab nations, as well as help the growth of partnerships based on knowledge and culture.”

Usage statistics
Over 5,000 users registered on its first day with over 8 million sessions, reaching 69 million searches in its first 10 months.

Wider context
The project is part of a larger goal of education reform in Egypt, with plans to increase investment in research and higher education sectors, and is focused at supplementing the curriculum of schools and universities and on providing high quality resources to lower socioeconomic areas.

Overcoming access barriers
Access is free for all Egyptian citizens, estimated at over 92 million at launch, by using their National ID and email for registration. Seminars have been held in several public universities and Youm7 has reported on how to register to teach users who are unfamiliar with the internet. Formal training for teachers is also available via The Teachers First program run by the Ministry of Education.

Content known to be indexed
Online Library resources include:
 Atomic Training
 Acland's Video Atlas of Human Anatomy
 Cambridge University Press
 Cell Press
 Cengage Learning e-textbooks
 The Centre for Agriculture and Bioscience International
 Chemspider
 ClinicalKey
 Dar Al Mandumah
 Discovery Education
 Doctrinal Plus
 EBSCO Information Services
 Elsevier
 Emerald Publishing
 Encyclopedia Britannica
 The Institution of Engineering and Technology
 LexisNexis
 National Geographic
 The New England Journal of Medicine
 One Click Digital
 Oxford University Press
 Obeikan Bookstore
 ProQuest Dissertations and Theses
 Royal Society of Chemistry E-Books
 SAGE Online Journals
 Scopus
 Springer Journals & E-Books
 Taylor & Francis Group
 Thomson Reuters
 Wiley
 Wolters Kluwer
 Wolfram Mathematica

At launch the service was limited by its predominantly English language content, in a national context where only 35% of the population currently know English as an additional language, and that only a little over a third of Egyptians have access to the internet.

References

Education in Egypt
Library-related organizations